In radiology, the deep lateral femoral notch sign is a finding on a lateral radiograph that is considered an indirect sign of a torn anterior cruciate ligament (ACL). It is an abnormal deepening of the lateral condylopatellar sulcus from an osteochondral impaction fracture. A depth greater than 1.5 mm is a reliable sign of a torn ACL.

References

Musculoskeletal radiographic signs